Richard Yuille is an American judge. In 2009 Yuille became the chief judge of the 7th Circuit Court of Genesee County in Michigan. He is known for acting as the judge for cases against the State of Michigan during the Flint Water Crisis. He is a former editor of the Journal of Law Reform, and graduated with his JD from the University of Michigan Law School.

References

Living people
21st-century American judges
University of Michigan Law School alumni
Year of birth missing (living people)